À travers les Hauts-de-France, formerly known as the Paris–Arras Tour is a one-day cycling race that has been held annually in northern France since 2010. 

Between 2010 and 2021, it was a men's professional stage race, part of UCI Europe Tour in category 2.2. In January 2022, it was announced that the 2022 edition of the race would change format, becoming a professional women's one-day race in category 1.2.

Winners

Men's race (2010-2021)

Women's race (2022 onwards)

References

External links

Cycle races in France
2010 establishments in France
Recurring sporting events established in 2010

Women's road bicycle races